Ancylosis uncinatella is a species of snout moth in the genus Ancylosis. It was described by Ragonot in 1890. It is found in Spain.

The wingspan is about 20 mm.

References

Moths described in 1890
uncinatella
Moths of Europe